Kaleb Gunner Olszewski (born November 26, 1996) is an American football wide receiver and return specialist for the Pittsburgh Steelers of the National Football League (NFL). He played college football at Bemidji State as a cornerback.

Early life 
Olszewski was born in Alvin, Texas, to Eric and Collette Olszewski. He graduated from Alvin High School, where he played football, where he set school records for tackles and interceptions, and baseball; He has two brothers: one older and one younger.

College career 
Olszewski played for the Bemidji State University Beavers in Bemidji, Minnesota, a Division II school, as a cornerback. In his 2015 freshman season, Olszewski was named Northern Sun Intercollegiate Conference Newcomer of the Year. Olszewski won Defensive Player of the Year in the Northern Sun Intercollegiate Conference as a senior in 2018. He also returned punts and held for field goals and extra points.

Professional career

New England Patriots

2019 season
Olszewski was not selected in the 2019 NFL Draft. After the draft, he was invited to participate in rookie minicamps by the Minnesota Vikings, who used him at cornerback, and the New England Patriots, who used him at wide receiver. On May 23, 2019, after the retirement of Jared Veldheer gave the Patriots a roster opening, they signed Olszewski to an undrafted free agent contract. The three-year deal had a $2,500 signing bonus.

On August 31, the day that teams were required to trim their preseason 90-man rosters to 53-man rosters, the Patriots told Olszewski that morning that he would be waived; instead, the Patriots kept him after trading cornerback Keion Crossen less than an hour before the deadline.

He made his NFL debut in the Patriots' 33–3 Week 1 win against the Pittsburgh Steelers, returning two punts for 35 yards (averaging 17.5 yards per return). He recorded his first receptions in Week 6 against the New York Giants; targeted three times, he had two receptions, for five and 29 yards. He was placed on injured reserve on November 19, 2019, with ankle and hamstring injuries.

2020 season
On September 12, 2020, Olszewski was placed on injured reserve with a foot injury. He was activated on October 5, 2020, before the team's Week 4 game against Kansas City; because of the COVID-19 pandemic, the minimum stay on IR for the 2020 season was reduced to three games.

In Week 12, against the Arizona Cardinals, Olszewski returned a punt 82 yards to the end zone, but it was called back because of an illegal block by linebacker Anfernee Jennings; after the penalty, it was recorded as a 58-yard return. A week later, against the Los Angeles Chargers, Olszewski had three punt returns totaling 145 yards. His first went for 70 yards and was the first touchdown of his career; he followed it up with returns of 14 and 61 yards. He also added the first receiving touchdown of his career in the fourth quarter, catching a 38-yard touchdown pass from backup quarterback Jarrett Stidham in garbage time during the Patriots' 45–0 shutout. Olszewski was named the AFC Special Teams Player of the Week for his performance in Week 13. He finished the season with a league-high 346 punt return yards on 20 returns. His average of 17.3 yards per return was a franchise record and the second-highest total since the AFL-NFL merger (after Leodis McKelvin's 18.7 yards per return in 2012).

In January 2021 Olszewski was named to the 2020 AP All-Pro first team as a punt returner. He is the first Patriots punt returner so honored. He received 28 of 50 votes at punt returner, as well as one vote for special teamer. One voter, Aaron Schatz of Football Outsiders, noted that Olszewski's punt returns had twice the value of any other punt returner.

2021 season
Through 9 games, Olszewski ranked second in punt return yards, with 248 yards on 18 returns. In his second game in SoFi Stadium against the Chargers, Olszewski had four returns for 80 yards, with three returns of 20+ yards, a feat last accomplished by a Patriot in 2000 when Troy Brown did it.

Pittsburgh Steelers
On March 21, 2022, Olszewski signed a two-year contract with the Pittsburgh Steelers.

NFL career statistics

Regular season

Postseason

Notes

References

External links
New England Patriots bio
Bemidji State Beavers bio

1996 births
Living people
American people of Polish descent
Bemidji State Beavers football players
New England Patriots players
People from Alvin, Texas
Players of American football from Texas
Sportspeople from the Houston metropolitan area
Pittsburgh Steelers players